Weitz & Luxenberg P.C. is a large personal injury and medical malpractice law firm headquartered in New York, specializing in asbestos litigation. The firm also specializes in medical malpractice, consumer protection, and environmental protection litigation.

Overview 
Weitz & Luxenberg is the largest law firm of its kind in New York State.  Overall, the firm has won over $27 billion in verdicts and settlements from lawsuits. The firm has 84 associate lawyers and 3 partners, with offices in Los Angeles, New York City, and Cherry Hill, New Jersey. The firm was founded in 1986 by Perry Weitz and Arthur Luxenberg.

Perry Weitz
Perry Weitz co-founded the firm with Arthur Luxenberg in 1986. Weitz soon started to represent workers from the construction trades who had been exposed to asbestos.

In a 2002 New York Times article, law professor Lester Brickman, asserted that sick people with legitimate claims represented only a tiny fraction of the asbestos claims being brought in court. Weitz responded that juries throughout the United States had awarded damages to people exposed to asbestos, and argued for faith in the jury system."

Asbestos-related litigation
The firm's specialty is suing companies that made asbestos or used asbestos products. For example, in 2011, the firm won a verdict against Goodyear Tire. The lawsuit claimed that two Goodyear employees, who were smokers, were exposed to asbestos while working at Goodyear. The verdict was $22 million. According to The New York Post, in 2014 "Weitz & Luxenberg won a record $190 million in a consolidated trial for five mesothelioma victims who worked in different jobs for different employers."

In 2014, the firm got its clients $8.7 billion in verdicts and settlements. In 2010, that figure was $6.9 billion.

The firm's first large verdict involved an asbestos case from workers from the Brooklyn Navy Yard. The lawsuit was on behalf of 36 workers from the yard. In the end, the firm got the clients a total verdict of $75 million.

Suit on behalf of congresswoman
In June 2013, Congresswoman Carolyn McCarthy (D-NY) announced to the public that she had lung cancer.  That same year, McCarthy hired Weitz & Luxenberg to sue over 70 asbestos companies for her lung cancer. In her suit, McCarthy claims that asbestos, not smoking, gave her lung cancer. McCarthy's brothers and fathers worked on ships and in utilities. McCarthy claims in the lawsuit that asbestos fibers stuck to their clothing, were carried home, and caused her lung cancer.

Pre-packaged bankruptcies
Weitz & Luxenberg often advises companies it assists with pre-packaged bankruptcies to retain the services of Gilbert Heintz & Randolph (GHR) in order to make proceedings move faster. GHR specializes in litigating coverage disputes with insurance companies on behalf of asbestos defendants. GHR also serves as co-counsel for creditors. GHR played this very role in the Congoleum bankruptcy at the personal recommendation of Perry Weitz. GHR appointed its subsidiary, the Kenesis Group, to process the claims associated with the Congoleum bankruptcy. Kenesis was paid a flat-fee per claim processed. Congoleum's insurers challenged the appointment of GHR on the grounds that the bankruptcy code requires lawyers hired to represent debtors in possession to have no interests adverse to the estate and to be otherwise totally disinterested. Congoleum countered that GHR was merely special counsel and therefore subject to less stringent rules. The bankruptcy court ruled in favor of Congoleum. GHR later disclosed that it served as co-counsel with Weitz & Luxenberg for about 10,000 clients with claims against Congoleum.

Asbestos bankruptcy trusts
Attorneys from Weitz & Luxenberg serve on fifteen trust advisory committees that govern asbestos bankruptcy trusts. The fifteen trusts advised by Weitz & Luxenberg paid $12.2 billion between 2006 and 2013. Weitz clients also receive payments from other trusts. These other trusts made $51.6 billion in payments over the same period. Plaintiff attorneys typical receive 25% of this money. Perry Weitz helped set up the trusts for Owens Corning, USG, and Kaiser Aluminum. The 15 trusts guided by Weitz have paid out $12.2 billion between 2006 and 2013. Other trusts, which may also pay Weitz clients, have doled out $51.6 billion, the report says. Lawyers typically get at least 25 percent of the payments.

In 2006, Weitz & Luxenberg won a $25 million verdict against DaimlerChrysler in Manhattan's special asbestos court. At trial Weitz denied that Johns Manville had any liability towards their client. A year after the trial Weitz filed a trust claim against Johns Manville for the same client.

Ford Motor Company accused Weitz & Luxenberg of engaging in misleading conduct in the case of Arthur Juni. Ford asked Judge Barbara Jaffe to reduce the $11-million verdict in the case because it believes the plaintiff could have filed claims with the Raybestos and Wagner bankruptcy trusts. Ford claimed that Juni was entitled to $125,000 from the Raybestos trust and between $100,000 and $300,000 from the Wagner trust. It was later determined that the Wagner trust is no longer accepting claims. Ford claimed that only "gamesmanship" could be the motive for not filing claims against these trusts. Ford relied on a 2014 ruling by Judge Hodges in the Garlock bankruptcy to show that delaying the filing of trust claims was a routine practice. Jaffe granted Ford's motion. The dollar amount of the previous verdict was overturned on appeal in a different proceeding.

Sheldon Silver
Sheldon Silver served as Speaker of the New York Assembly from 1994 to 2015. During his tenure as Speaker of the New York Assembly, Silver worked for Weitz & Luxenberg. In 2012, he earned between $350,000 and $450,000. In 2013, Silver earned between $650,000 and $750,000. In 2015, Silver was convicted on charges that he had provided $500,000 in government research grants to a doctor in exchange for the doctor referring nearly fifty patients to Weitz & Luxenberg.
In response to the arrest of Silver on corruption charges, the firm publicly said it was "shocked." After his arrest, Silver took a leave of absence from the firm. Although convicted at trial, Silver's conviction was overturned on appeal.

References

External links
 Weitz and Luxenberg TV Commercials
 Weitz & Luxenberg campaign contributions - Influence Explorer (Sunlight Foundation)
 Weitz & Luxenberg YouTube channel
 Treatment choices for Mesothelioma Cancer

Asbestos
Law firms based in New York City